Eli Apple (né Woodard, born August 9, 1995) is an American football cornerback for the Cincinnati Bengals of the National Football League (NFL). He played college football at Ohio State, where he was a part of the team that won the 2015 College Football Playoff National Championship, and was selected by the New York Giants in the first round of the 2016 NFL Draft. He has also played for the New Orleans Saints and Carolina Panthers.

High school career
Apple, born Eli Woodard, was born to a Ghanaian mother and lived a couple of years in the country. He attended Eastern Regional High School in Voorhees, New Jersey.  Apple was rated the top prospect in New Jersey in the 2013 class by Rivals.com and was ranked the 28th best prospect nationally. He received about twenty scholarship offers, including offers from Alabama, California, Virginia Tech, Boston College, Wisconsin, Tennessee, Purdue, Miami, Georgia Tech, Maryland, Michigan, Ole Miss, Nebraska, North Carolina, NC State, and Clemson and ranked his top three schools as Rutgers, Ohio State, and Notre Dame. On February 12, 2012, he announced his verbal commitment to Ohio State after Rutgers head coach Greg Schiano left for the Tampa Bay Buccaneers.

College career
Apple enrolled at Ohio State in January 2013 as a five-star prospect (ESPN 150) and was rated as high as the No. 11 prospect nationally on the ESPN 150. He was also rated as the No. 1 overall prospect in New Jersey and No. 6 cornerback prospect nationally by 247sports. He redshirted as a true freshman and went on to play in 2014 as a redshirt freshman. He played in the 2015 Sugar Bowl and the 2015 College Football Playoff National Championship. In his second season with the Buckeyes, he was the Defensive MVP.

Professional career

On January 4, 2016, Apple announced his decision to forgo his remaining eligibility and enter the 2016 NFL Draft. Apple attended the NFL Scouting Combine and completed the majority of combine drills before suffering cramps. He finished with the tenth fastest time in the 40-yard dash among all participating players at the NFL Combine.

On March 11, 2016, Apple attended Ohio State's pro day, but opted to stand on his combine numbers and only performed the short shuttle, three-cone drill, and positional drills. Apple had pre-draft visits with multiple teams, including the Buffalo Bills, San Francisco 49ers, and Tennessee Titans. At the conclusion of the pre-draft process, Apple was projected to be an early to mid first round pick by NFL draft experts and scouts. He was ranked the third best cornerback prospect in the draft by DraftScout.com, was ranked the fourth best cornerback by NFL analyst Mike Mayock, and was ranked the sixth best defensive back by Sports Illustrated.

New York Giants
The New York Giants selected Apple in the first round (10th overall) of the 2016 NFL Draft. Apple was the second cornerback drafted in 2016, after Jalen Ramsey (5th overall). It was reported that the New York Giants had initially planned to draft linebacker Leonard Floyd or offensive tackle Jack Conklin. However, circumstances changed after Laremy Tunsil unexpectedly fell out of the top ten. The Tennessee Titans traded ahead of the Giants to draft Jack Conklin (8th overall) and the Chicago Bears traded ahead of the Giants to select Leonard Floyd (9th overall). New York Giants’ General Manager Jerry Reese opted to keep the tenth overall pick and selected Apple who was their highest graded player available on their draft board without any issues or injuries. Draft analysts and fans criticized the selection of Apple as many deemed it to be a reach.

2016
On May 6, 2016, the New York Giants signed Apple to a fully guaranteed four year, $15.15 million that includes a signing bonus of $9.21 million.

Apple entered training camp slated as the third cornerback on the depth chart behind veterans Janoris Jenkins and Dominique Rodgers-Cromartie.  Head coach Ben McAdoo named Apple the third cornerback on the depth chart to begin the regular season and first-team nickelback.

He made his professional regular season debut in the New York Giants’ season-opener at the Dallas Cowboys and recorded four solo tackles during their 20–19 victory. On September 25, 2016, Apple earned his first career start and recorded one solo tackle in a 29–27 loss to the Washington Redskins, but left the game in the second quarter after suffering hamstring injury. Apple was inactive for the Giants’ Week 4 loss at the Minnesota Vikings with a hamstring injury. He was also sidelined for their Week 6 win against the Baltimore Ravens due to a groin injury. On November 7, 2016, he started his second game in a row and made four solo tackles against the Philadelphia Eagles but was benched in favor of Trevin Wade as the Giants won 28–23. On November 14, 2016, Apple started his first game at outside corner, with Rodgers-Cromartie covering the slot and made one solo tackle in a 21–20 victory over the Cincinnati Bengals. In Week 11, Apple collected a season-high nine combined tackles in a 22–16 victory over the Chicago Bears. On December 4, 2016, Apple recorded five combined tackles, broke up two passes, recovered a fumble, and made his first career interception in the Giants’ 24–14 loss at the Pittsburgh Steelers in Week 13. Apple intercepted a pass attempt by Steelers’ quarterback Ben Roethlisberger, that was originally intended for wide receiver Eli Rogers, during the third quarter. Apple started the last ten games of the season and finished his rookie season in 2016 with 51 combined tackles (41 solo), seven pass deflections, one interception, and a forced fumble in 14 games and 11 starts.

2017
Apple entered training camp slated as a starting outside cornerback. Head coach Ben McAdoo named Apple and Janoris Jenkins the starting outside cornerbacks to begin the regular season with Dominique Rodgers-Cromartie as the starting slot cornerback.

He started the Giants' season-opening 19–3 loss to the Dallas Cowboys and made seven combined tackles and a pass deflection. Apple was benched for the majority of the Giants’ Week 5 loss to the Los Angeles Chargers due to disciplinary reasons. On October 15, 2017, Apple recorded five solo tackles and a career-high three pass deflections, helping the Giants gain their first victory of the season over the Denver Broncos. Apple was heavily criticized by the New York Giants’ coaching staff for his performance during their Week 10 loss at the San Francisco 49ers. As a result of his performance, Apple was benched as a healthy scratch for the next four games (Weeks 11–14). On December 4, 2017, the New York Giants fired head coach Ben McAdoo after they fell to a 2–10 record. Defensive coordinator Steve Spagnuolo was named the interim head coach for the last four games. In Week 14, Apple was disciplined after posting on Twitter while on the sidelines of the Giants’ Week 14 loss to the Dallas Cowboys. He also aggravated teammates by posting a comment after the game which stated former Ohio State teammate and Dallas Cowboys’ fullback Rod Smith “iced the New York Giants” after scoring two touchdowns during the fourth quarter. In Week 15, he returned as a backup cornerback and collected a season-high nine combined tackles during a 34–29 loss to the Philadelphia Eagles.

On December 20, 2017, it was reported that tensions between Apple and his teammates had reached an all-time high, with Giants’ safety Landon Collins saying Apple was a "cancer" and should not be on the team in 2018. On December 27, 2017, Apple was suspended by the team for the 2017 season finale after reportedly getting into an argument with coaching staff about being asked to practice with the scout team and for a "pattern of behavior that is conduct detrimental to the team". Apple finished the 2017 NFL season with 49 combined tackles (41 solo) and eight pass deflections in 11 games and seven starts.

2018
The Giants new coach, Pat Shurmur, said about Apple that he "believe[d] in a clean slate". Apple was to be a starting cornerback  alongside safeties Landon Collins and Curtis Riley.

On September 16, 2018, Apple recorded one tackle before exiting in the third quarter of the Giants’ 20–13 loss at the Dallas Cowboys due to a groin injury. His injury sidelined him for the next two games (Weeks 3–4). In Week 6, he collected eight combined tackles and recorded a season-high three pass deflections during a 34–13 loss to the Philadelphia Eagles.

New Orleans Saints 
On October 23, 2018, the New York Giants traded Apple to the New Orleans Saints for a fourth round pick in the 2019 NFL Draft and a seventh round pick in the 2020 NFL Draft. The New Orleans Saints traded for Apple in order to add him to their depleted secondary. Cornerback Patrick Robinson was placed on injured reserve after breaking his ankle in Week 3 and cornerback Ken Crawley sustained an injury to his oblique the day before the trade. Head coach Sean Payton immediately named Apple a starting cornerback, reuniting him with former Ohio State secondary teammates Marshon Lattimore and Vonn Bell.

On October 28, 2018, Apple made his New Orleans Saints’ debut and collected nine solo tackles in a 30–20 win at the Minnesota Vikings in Week 8. On November 11, 2018, Apple recorded his first interception with the Saints in a 51–14 victory over the Cincinnati Bengals.

On May 1, 2019, the Saints declined the fifth-year option on Apple's contract. He started 15 games in 2019, recording 58 tackles, four passes defensed, and a forced fumble. During the 2020 free agency period, Apple was set to sign with the Las Vegas Raiders before the deal fell through.

Carolina Panthers 
On May 29, 2020, Apple signed a one-year, $3 million contract with the Carolina Panthers. He was placed on injured reserve on September 7, 2020 with ankle and foot injuries. He was activated on October 3, 2020. He was released by the team on October 27, 2020.

Cincinnati Bengals 
On March 23, 2021, Apple signed a one-year contract with the Cincinnati Bengals.

In 18 games (regular season and postseason) as a starter in 2021, Apple recorded 49 tackles, 2 interceptions, and a fumble recovery.

Following Super Bowl LVI, Apple became a subject of scrutiny and mockery for allowing Cooper Kupp to score the Rams’ game winning touchdown late in the fourth quarter. He had previously trash talked and trolled other players on social media, notably Kansas City Chiefs wide receivers Tyreek Hill and Mecole Hardman, who had lost to Apple and the Bengals in the AFC Championship Game two weeks prior.

Apple re-signed with the Bengals on a one-year contract on March 19, 2022.

NFL career statistics

Personal life
Apple was born in Philadelphia, Pennsylvania and was raised by his mother Annie Apple and stepfather Tim Apple in Voorhees Township, New Jersey. He is also the nephew of actor and comedian Michael Blackson. In 2012, he changed his name from Eli Woodard to Eli Apple.

References

External links

Ohio State Buckeyes bio
Profile at ESPN.com

1995 births
Living people
21st-century African-American sportspeople
African-American players of American football
Eastern Regional High School alumni
People from Voorhees Township, New Jersey
Players of American football from New Jersey
Sportspeople from Camden County, New Jersey
Players of American football from Philadelphia
Ohio State Buckeyes football players
New York Giants players
New Orleans Saints players
Carolina Panthers players
Cincinnati Bengals players
American sportspeople of Ghanaian descent